Tomasz Dziubinski (born 8 July 1968 in Poland) is a Polish football manager who now works as head coach of GKS Jodła Jedlnia-Letnisko in his home country.

Career

Dziubinski started his senior career with Broń Radom. In 1989, he signed for Wisła Kraków in the Polish Ekstraklasa, where he made sixty-two league appearances and scored thirty goals. After that, he played for Club Brugge KV, R.W.D. Molenbeek, Le Mans, A.S. Verbroedering Geel, and Mazowsze Grójec.

References

External links 
 In Bruges, they caught their heads hearing about how we trained in Poland
 Tomasz Dziubiński – the first Pole to score in the Champions League
 Rapid career of "Dziubek" 
 INTERVIEW Tomasz Dziubiński: Now I'm fulfilling myself like in the Champions League 
 Tomasz Dziubiński on holidays and more

1968 births
Polish football managers
Living people
Date of birth missing (living people)
Place of birth missing (living people)
Polish footballers
Poland international footballers
Association football forwards
Club Brugge KV players